Oidaematophorus castor is a moth of the family Pterophoridae  first described by William Barnes and Arthur Ward Lindsey in 1921. It is found in North America, including Arizona (the type location is the Santa Catalina Mountains), British Columbia and Alberta.

References

Oidaematophorini
Moths described in 1921
Moths of North America